Jim Krivacs (born ) is an American former college basketball player for the University of Texas at Austin.

Krivacs transferred to Texas from Auburn and was a three-year starter for the Longhorns under head coach Abe Lemons, beginning in Lemons' first year at Texas. He twice earned All-America honors—as a first-team All-America selection as a junior in 1978 and as a second-team selection in 1979. Krivacs led the Longhorns in scoring as a sophomore and junior and was second in scoring as a senior. He scored an average of 22.0 points per game in 1978 and 19.5 points per game for his three-year Texas career. His career point total and career scoring average remain eighth- and sixth-highest, respectively, in program history.

In 1978, Krivacs helped to lead Texas to a 26–5 overall record, a share of the Southwest Conference championship, the 1978 National Invitation Tournament championship, and a final ranking of No. 17 in the Associated Press Poll. Along with teammate Ron Baxter, he was named co-MVP of the 1978 NIT. As a senior, Krivacs helped to lead the 1979 Longhorns to a 21–8 overall record, a share of the Southwest Conference championship for the second consecutive season, an appearance in the 1979 NCAA Tournament, and a No. 15 final ranking in the Coaches Poll. In 1979, he was the first Texas men's basketball player to receive recognition as a first-team Academic All-American. Krivacs was selected in the sixth round of the 1979 NBA draft by the Kansas City Kings.

Notes and references

1950s births
Living people
American men's basketball players
Auburn Tigers men's basketball players
Basketball players from Indianapolis
Kansas City Kings draft picks
Point guards
Texas Longhorns men's basketball players
Year of birth missing (living people)